Victoria Park & Bow was a short-lived railway station in Bow, east London.

The LBER had hoped to run through to Stratford but its relationship with the ECR was poor and a junction allowing connection from the LBER's line to the ECR's was not constructed.

It appears Victoria Park & Bow station was little-used, as the ECR stopped few trains there. In the London-bound direction there were no weekday services whilst just two services called on Sunday at 1:05 p.m. and 9:28 p.m. As a result, LBER services mostly terminated at Bow and Bromley. The Fenchurch Street services on the LBER branch lasted until 26 September 1850. Limited services on the ECR's main line continued to call until 6 January 1851.

By 1854 relations between the two companies had improved and the junction connecting the two lines was built and the LBER became part of the initial London, Tilbury and Southend Railway (LTSR) route to Fenchurch Street (with the more direct route from  opening in 1858).

The nearest station to the site of the former Victoria Park & Bow station today is Bow Church,  on the Docklands Light railway, a train from there towards Stratford passes the site of the former station as the DLR line joins the Great Eastern Main Line.

References

Notes

Disused railway stations in the London Borough of Tower Hamlets
Former Great Eastern Railway stations
Railway stations in Great Britain opened in 1849
Railway stations in Great Britain closed in 1851
Bow, London